Witches Brew is a former underground European record label which sold music via online distribution. The label was closed when the husband of the owner died.

Background
Witches Brew was born out of online magazine "The Metal Gospel" and began signing mainly extreme metal artists in early 2002.

The name Witches Brew was inspired by the Manilla Road song "Witches Brew".

last artists

 Acero Letal
 Acid Age
 Alitor
 Amok
 Blackened
 Chain of Dogs
 Endless Recovery
 Excimer
 Goat of Mendes
 Hammerwhore
 Hillbilly Revenge
 Midnite Hellion
 Nightbreed
 Pyöveli
 Redimoni
 Saboter
 Shrapnel Storm
 Speed Whöre
 Tyrant's Kall
 Vigilance
 Надимач

Releases
BREW055 - NADIMAC - "Manifest Protiv Sudbine" 
BREW054 - SHRAPNEL STORM - "Mother War" 
BREW053 - SPEED WHÖRE - "The Future Is Now" 
BREW052 - NIGHTBREED - "Nightbreed" 
BREW051 - VOLCANIC - “Okkult Witch” 
BREW050 - BLACKENED - “Underground Attack” 
BREW049 - ACERO LETAL - "Veloz Invencible / Duro Metal" 
BREW048 - EXCIMER - "Thrash from Fire" 
BREW047 - SABOTER - “Saboter” 
BREW046 - HUMAN SLAUGHTER / HILLBILLY REVENGE - “Hillbilly Slaughter” 
BREW045 - PYÖVELI - “Still Underground” 
BREW044 - ACID AGE - “Drone Shark Ethics” 
BREW043 - TYRANT'S KALL - “Dagon” 
BREW042 - ENDLESS RECOVERY - “Resistant Bangers” 
BREW041 - ALITOR - “Eternal Depression” 
BREW040 - REDIMONI / GRAVEYARD - “The Procession of the Gravedemons - The Ultimate Profanation” 
BREW039 - TERRA CAPUT MUNDI - “Lost in the Warp” 
BREW038 - SEASONS OF THE WOLF - "Anthology" 
BREW037 - CHAIN OF DOGS - "Burning Bridges in a World of Death - De Ep's en nog get mieë" 
BREW036 - AMOK - "Somewhere in the West" 
BREW035 - MIDNITE HELLION "Hour Of The Wolf" 
BREW034 - STONE MAGNUM - "From Time... to Eternity" 
BREW033 - SACRIFICIAL BLOOD - "Unholy Fucking Hatred" 
BREW032 - CHAIN OF DOGS - "Gebroake, gehange en gewroake" 
BREW031 - PYÖVELI - "Not a God, Just an Executioner 
BREW030 - DEATHHAMMER - "Phantom Knights" 
BREW029 - EVIL SHEPHERD - "Sowing Death" 
BREW028 - MECHANIX - "Sonic Point Blank" 
BREW027 - HORRIFIER - "Grim Fate" 
BREW026 - SCYTHE - "Season Of The Tall Pines" 
BREW025 - TORTURE PULSE - "Plague Poetry" 
BREW024 - AMOK - "Downhill Without Brakes" 
BREW023 - SALUTE - "The Underground" 
BREW022 - SAURON - "Satanic Assassins" 
BREW021 - MADGOYA - "Put Olindrali Avlijanera" 
BREW020 - DEATHHAMMER - "Forever Ripping Fast" 
BREW019 - IMMACULATE - "Thrash, Kill 'N' Deströy" 
BREW018 - REDIMONI - "Into The Coiling Arms Of Mayhem" 
BREW017 - PYÖVELI - "The New Renaissance Of Speed & Thrash Metal" 
BREW016 - SCYTHE - "Decay" 
BREW015 - GAMA BOMB - "Survival Of The Fastest" 
BREW014 - REDIMONI - "The Onset Of Chaos" 
BREW013 - HAMMERWHORE - "Hammerwhore" 
BREW012 - DEVIL LEE ROT - "Metalizer" 
BREW011 - SCYTHE - "The Process Of Rotting" 
BREW010 - VEXED - "Destruction Warfare" 
BREW009 - DEVIL LEE ROT - "Metal Dictator / Soldier From Hell" 
BREW008 - TOXIC HOLOCAUST - "Evil Never Dies" 
BREW007 - SCYTHE - "Poetry Of Illusions" 
BREW006 - DEVIL LEE ROT - "Hellscraper / A Little Devil Ain't Enough" 
BREW005 - THE CHASM - "Conjuration Of The Spectral Empire" 
BREW004 - VEXED - "Nightmare Holocaust" 
BREW003 - THARGOS - "Killfukk" 
BREW002 - HATEWORK - "Madbent For Disaster" 
BREW001 - SCYTHE - "On My Way Home"

See also
 List of record labels

External links
Witches Brew on bandcamp

German record labels
Record labels established in 2002
Heavy metal record labels